Buendia station is a former railway station located on the South Main Line in Makati, Metro Manila, Philippines.

Buendia was the ninth station from Tutuban and is one of three stations serving Makati, the other two being Pasay Road and EDSA. It was permanently closed in favor of a newly constructed, more spacious Dela Rosa station located south across Dela Rosa Street.

History
Buendia station was opened on November 24, 1975 as part of the 83rd anniversary of PNR coincided with the track duplication from Paco to Pasay Road, the station was renovated from 1989 to 1990 for the Metrotren Commuter service.

During the Northrail–Southrail Linkage Project, the platforms were raised with renovation of the station area and formally reopened on July 14, 2009.

On September 8, 2017, the station was closed due to short platforms where four to five-car trains do not fit. A new station was built south of the former station.

The station will be reconstructed and reopened as a major stop on the North–South Commuter Railway. The opening date is set between 2024 and 2028.

Station Layout

Gallery

Nearby landmarks
The station is near Cash and Carry Mall in Barangay Palanan and an SM Hypermarket on the other side of the Osmeña Highway in Barangay San Isidro.  Further away from the station are Makati Central Square (formerly Makati Cinema Square) and Exportbank Plaza. Neaby schools are San Antonio National High School, Pio Del Pilar Elementary School and San Isidro National High School. A cluster of Cityland condominiums is located right behind the station.

Transportation links
Buendia station is accessible by jeepneys and buses plying the Taft Avenue and South Luzon Expressway routes. A terminal for San Antonio cycle rickshaws is located across the station on the other side of Gil Puyat Avenue, while Pio del Pilar cycle rickshaws also drop commuters off at the station.

The station was located roughly midway between Buendia MRT Stations at the intersection with Epifanio de los Santos Avenue and Gil Puyat LRT Station at the intersection with Taft Avenue.

References

Philippine National Railways stations
Railway stations in Metro Manila
Railway stations opened in 2009
Buildings and structures in Makati